Egypt is a rural locality in the Lockyer Valley Region, Queensland, Australia.

History 
In June 1912, a public meeting called for the establishment of a school as there were about 17 children who would attend. John Renton offered  of his land for the school. However, there is no evidence that the school was ever established.

Education 
There are no schools in Egypt. The nearest government primary schools are Flagstone Creek State School in neighbouring Flagstone Creek to the north and Mount Whitestone State School in neighbouring Mount Whitestone to the east. The nearest government secondary schools are Lockyer District State High School in Gatton to the north-east and Centenary Heights State High School in Centenary Heights, Tooowoomba, to the north-west.

References 

Lockyer Valley Region
Localities in Queensland